Kenneth Goslant is an American politician. He has served in the Vermont House of Representatives from the Washington-1 district since 2019 as a Republican.

References

21st-century American politicians
Living people
Year of birth missing (living people)
Place of birth missing (living people)
Republican Party members of the Vermont House of Representatives